A shade house is a horticultural structure which provides a mix of shade and light to provide suitable conditions for shade-loving plants, or to reduce the temperatures under the cover.  Typically it will have a frame which supports mesh fabric or wood lath.

Shade houses may also be used in commercial horticulture.  For example, vanilla vines need 50% shade and, in deforested areas of Mexico, this is provided by shade houses of 1,000 – 10,000 square metres.  These have tree-like support posts or actual living trees.  From these, shade cloth walls of 3–5 metres height are suspended and these are black or red to cut the luminosity by half.

References

Gallery    

Agricultural buildings
Garden features